McIlraith is a surname. Notable people with the surname include:

 George McIlraith (1908–1992), Canadian lawyer and politician
 Hugh McIlraith (19th century), New Zealand politician
 Sheila McIlraith, Canadian computer scientist